
Araruama Lagoon is a lagoon located in the Região dos Lagos, Rio de Janeiro State, Brazil. It is one of the largest permanent hypersaline lagoons in the world, being 220 km2 in area, 40 km long and 13 km wide.

References

Saline lakes of South America
Lagoons of Brazil
Lakes of Brazil